The Vulcanair SF.600 Canguro (en: "Kangaroo") was a feederliner developed in Italy in the late 1970s. Despite a number of attempts to put the aircraft into series production, only a small number were ever built. The Canguro was a high-wing cantilever monoplane of conventional configuration with a fuselage of rectangular cross-section and a high-set tail. The tricycle undercarriage was not retractable, and its main units were carried on sponsons on the fuselage sides. SIAI Marchetti provided funding towards the construction of the prototype, and constructed this aircraft at the former Aviamilano plant. After flight testing proved positive, the type was put on sale, but failed to attract buyers in any number, even when the original piston engines were exchanged for turboprops and retractable undercarriage was offered as an option.

Following their acquisition of SIAI Marchetti, Agusta continued to offer the design, and a contract for joint production was signed with Sammi in South Korea in 1992, but nothing came of this. A similar venture to produce the aircraft in conjunction with PADC in the Philippines proved similarly fruitless. PADC acquired two aircraft, RP-C1298 and RP-3101. In 1997, Vulcanair purchased the design from Finmeccanica (Agusta's parent company), but although a small number of examples were produced, no series production was undertaken. Vulcanair next proceeded to use the Canguro's fuselage to develop the single-engine Vulcanair Mission.

Variants
SF600
1982-variant with two Allison 250-B17C turboprop engines.
SF600A
1989-variant with increased mean take-off weight, two Allison 250-B17F/1 turboprop engines, modification to the wing aerodynamics and modifications to the landing gear support structure.

Specifications (SF.600TP)

References

 
 
 
 

1970s Italian airliners
SIAI Marchetti aircraft
General Avia aircraft
Canguro
Agusta aircraft
Aircraft first flown in 1978
High-wing aircraft
Twin-turboprop tractor aircraft